Ivan Anatolyevich Nedelko (born 12 May 1986) is a Russian tennis player.

Nedelko has a career high ATP singles ranking of 235 achieved on 23 July 2018. He also has a career high ATP doubles ranking of 449 achieved on 29 July 2019.

Nedelko made his ATP main draw debut at the 2011 St. Petersburg Open in the singles draw facing Potito Starace.

References

External links

1986 births
Living people
Russian male tennis players
Sportspeople from Saint Petersburg